Utah State Route 84 may refer to:

 Utah State Route 84, the state highway designation (legislative overlay) for Interstate 84 (except its concurrency with Interstate 15) within Utah, United States, that connects Interstate 80 at Echo Junction with Idaho State Line (through Summit, Morgan Weber and Box Elder counties)
 By Utah State law, Interstate 84 within the state has been defined as "State Route 84" since 1977
 Utah State Route 84 (1935-1977), a former state highway in northeastern Davis, Weber, and Box Elder counties, Utah, United States, that connected interstate 15 in Layton (in northern Davis County) with U.S. Route 89 in South Willard (in southeastern edge of Box Elder County)

See also

 List of state highways in Utah
 List of Interstate Highways in Utah
 List of named highway junctions in Utah
 List of highways numbered 84

External links

 State Road Resolutions: Route 84 (PDF)